Jean-Marie Pfaff (born 4 December 1953) is a Belgian former professional footballer who played as a goalkeeper who spent most of his professional career with Beveren and Bayern Munich. Pfaff was capped 64 times playing for Belgium, and participated at the 1982 FIFA World Cup and 1986 FIFA World Cup tournaments.

Club career
Pfaff was born in Lebbeke. At the age of 16, he joined K.S.K. Beveren with whom he won a Belgian champions title (1979) and a Belgian Cup (1978). The same year, he received the Belgian Golden Shoe. In 1982, he entered the Bayern Munich squad, getting three Bundesliga titles (from 1985 to 1987) and two German cups (1984 and 1986).

International career
Pfaff first played with the Red Devils in 1976 against the Netherlands. He was the goalkeeper during Euro 80 and Euro 84, and the 1982 and 1986 World Cups.

Style of play
Despite his sturdy physical build, Pfaff possessed quick reflexes and was known for his spectacular playing style, as well as his ability to produce acrobatic saves, which made him an effective shot-stopper. He was also known for his extroverted and outspoken character, his lively and eccentric personality, and his strong and charismatic leadership qualities, as well as his confidence, fair-play, and professionalism, which made him an excellent organiser of the defence and a popular figure among the fans; as such, due to his cheerful attitude on the pitch and humorous demeanor, he earned him the nickname El Simpático ("Mr. Nice Guy," in Spanish) during the 1986 World Cup in Mexico. He also excelled at quickly rushing off his line; moreover, although he was not the tallest goalkeeper, his large hands aided him when coming out to claim the ball, which made him an authoritative presence in goal. Furthermore, he was renowned for his penalty–stopping abilities. Despite his goalkeeping ability, however, and his reputation as one of the best goalkeepers in the world in his prime, and as one of Belgium's greatest goalkeepers ever – with some in the sport even ranking him as one of the best goalkeepers of all time –, he was also known to be inconsistent and prone to occasional errors.

After retirement
Pfaff was named by Pelé as one of the top 125 greatest living footballers in March 2004. He was a representative of company United Sol Energy in 2005. The company became the sponsor of the former East German record champion BFC Dynamo before the 2005-06 season. Pfaff became a member of BFC Dynamo and promoted the establishment of a new youth sports school at the club. The new youth sports school at BFC Dynamo was meant to bear his name. Pfaff visited the Sportforum Hohenschönhausen and participated in training with youth teams of BFC Dynamo. However, the sponsorship never materialized. Pfaff resigned from the club on 11 August 2006 and terminated his membership. He was a TV star in Belgium with the reality show De Pfaffs showing him and his family from 2002 to 2012.

Honours and awards 

Beveren
 Belgian First Division: 1978–79
 Belgian Cup: 1977–78
 Belgian Supercup: 1979

Bayern Munich
 Bundesliga: 1984–85, 1985–86, 1986–87
 DFB-Pokal: 1983–84, 1985–86
 DFL-Supercup: 1987–88
 European Cup runner-up: 1986–87

Belgium
 UEFA European Championship runner-up: 1980
 Belgian Sports Merit Award: 1980
 FIFA World Cup fourth place: 1986

Individual
 Belgian Golden Shoe: 1978
 Kicker Goalkeeper of the Year: 1983
 Kicker German Football Rankings - World Class Goalkeeper: 1983, 1986
 Ballon d'Or nominations: 1983, 1986, 1987
 European Goalkeeper of the Year: 1983, 1987
 FIFA World Cup All-Star Team: 1986
 FIFA World Cup Golden Glove: 1986
 France Football + La Gazzetta dello Sport + Guerin Sportivo World Cup team: 1986
 IFFHS World's Best Goalkeeper of the Year: 1987
 Belgian Golden Shoe of the 20th Century (6th): 1995
 IFFHS World Keeper of the Century (16th): 2000
 IFFHS European Keeper of the Century (10th): 2000
 Platina 11 (Best Team in 50 Years of Golden Shoe Winners): 2003
 FIFA 100: 2004
 Golden Foot Legends Award: 2014
 IFFHS All Time Belgium Dream Team: 2021
 Honorary Citizen of Beveren: 2022

Notes

References

External links

 
 
 
 
 

1953 births
Living people
Belgian footballers
Association football goalkeepers
K.S.K. Beveren players
FC Bayern Munich footballers
Lierse S.K. players
Trabzonspor footballers
FIFA 100
Belgium international footballers
Belgian Pro League players
Bundesliga players
Süper Lig players
UEFA Euro 1980 players
1982 FIFA World Cup players
UEFA Euro 1984 players
1986 FIFA World Cup players
Belgian football managers
K.V. Oostende managers
Belgian expatriate footballers
Expatriate footballers in West Germany
Belgian expatriate sportspeople in West Germany
Expatriate footballers in Turkey
Belgian expatriate sportspeople in Turkey
People from Lebbeke
Footballers from East Flanders